Ajnala is a town and union council of Gujrat District, in the Punjab province of Pakistan. It is located at 32°48'0N 74°15'0E with an altitude of 277 metres.<ref>Location of Ajnala - Falling Rain Genomics</ref

Ajnala is a famous historical village of Gujrat Pakistan ,village of Nawab's of Gujrat and many renowned personalities who had played vital role in the partition of Pakistan.Ajnala has remained significant throughout history.

References

Punjab, Pakistan
Gujrat, Pakistan